Berg connector is a brand of electrical connector used in computer hardware. Berg connectors are manufactured by Berg Electronics Corporation of St. Louis, Missouri, now part of Amphenol.

Overview
Berg connectors have a  pitch, pins are  square, and usually come as single or double row connectors.

Many types of Berg connectors exist. Some of the more familiar ones used in IBM PC compatibles are:
the four-pin polarized Berg connectors used to connect 3½-inch floppy disk drive units to the power supply unit, usually referred to as simply a "floppy power connector", but often also referred to as LP4. This connector has a  pitch (not 2.54 mm).
the two-pin Berg connectors used to connect the front panel lights, turbo switch, and reset button to the motherboard.
the two-pin Berg connectors used as jumpers for motherboard configuration.

Floppy drive power connector

The power connector on the 3½-inch floppy drive, informally known as "the Berg connector", is 2.50 mm pitch (distance from center to center of pins).

The power cable from the ATX power supply consists of 20 AWG wire to a 4-pin female connector.  The plastic connector housing is TE Connectivity / AMP 171822-4 with female metal contact pins are choice of TE Connectivity / AMP 170204-* or 170262-*, where * is 1 or 2 or 4.

The male PCB connector on the 3½-inch floppy drive is a polarized right-angle male header, which is a TE Connectivity / AMP 171826-4,  the straight model is AMP 171825-4.

Company history
In 1998, Berg Electronics was acquired by FCI (Framatome Connectors International) for $1.85 billion.  In 2016, FCI Asia Pte was acquired by Amphenol.

See also
 Electrical connector
 DC connector
 Insulation-displacement connector (IDC)
 JST connector
 Molex connector
 Pin header connector

References

External links

DC power connectors
Computer connectors
Floppy disk computer storage